Symperga is a genus of beetles in the family Cerambycidae, containing the following species:

 Symperga balyi (Thomson, 1860)
 Symperga puncticollis Breuning, 1940

References

Apomecynini